Kent State University at Salem (Kent State Salem) is a satellite campus in Salem Township and Salem, Ohio. Kent State Salem offers baccalaureate and associate degree programs and is administered with Kent State University at East Liverpool as Kent State University's Columbiana County Campuses.  As of 2021, enrollment at Kent State Salem was 957 with total enrollment for the Columbiana Campuses at over 1,400.  Kent State Salem occupies two buildings, the City Center and the Main Building. The City Center is located in downtown Salem on the former site of Salem High School, while the Main Building is located on the  campus in Salem Township, just south of the Salem city limits. In August 2011, the Health and Sciences wing was completed. The wing consists of additional centralized classrooms, labs, lecture hall and centralized faculty offices for nursing and radiology.

History

Kent State Salem was established in 1962 as an outreach program housed at Salem High School.  In 1966 it was relocated to an office building on South Broadway Street before it was moved to the permanent campus site in 1971.

Academics
Like other Kent State regional campuses, students at Kent State Salem can begin coursework for any of the undergraduate majors available at Kent State.  Combined with Kent State East Liverpool, more than 20 degrees are offered, including 12 bachelor's degrees. Tuition is also lower than at the main campus in Kent for in-state, lower division classes. Out-of-state tuition for residents in select counties in West Virginia and Pennsylvania was reduced in the spring of 2010. Residents must reside in either Brooke, Hancock or Ohio counties in West Virginia, or, Allegheny, Beaver, Butler, Crawford, Erie, Lawrence or Mercer county in Western Pennsylvania. As of September 2011, enrollment at Kent State Salem is 2,023.

References

External links

Kent State University
Education in Columbiana County, Ohio
Buildings and structures in Columbiana County, Ohio
1962 establishments in Ohio